Joseph "Joe" Chambers (born January 10, 1982) is an American wheelchair basketball player.

He was part of the US wheelchair basketball team at the 2008 Summer Paralympics in Beijing, China. USA came in 4th place at the tournament.

References

External links
  (2008)
  (2012)

1982 births
Living people
American men's wheelchair basketball players
Paralympic wheelchair basketball players of the United States
Paralympic bronze medalists for the United States
Paralympic medalists in wheelchair basketball
Wheelchair category Paralympic competitors
Wheelchair basketball players at the 2008 Summer Paralympics
Wheelchair basketball players at the 2012 Summer Paralympics
Medalists at the 2012 Summer Paralympics
21st-century American people